NGC 4380 is an unbarred spiral galaxy located in the constellation of Virgo. Located about 52.2 million light-years (16 Megaparsecs) away, is a member of the Virgo Cluster, a large galaxy cluster. It was discovered on March 10, 1826 by the astronomer John Herschel.

Gallery

References

External links 
 

4380
Unbarred spiral galaxies
Virgo (constellation)
Virgo Cluster
040507